York was a federal electoral district in New Brunswick, Canada, that was represented in the House of Commons of Canada from 1867 to 1917.

It was created as part of the British North America Act of 1867. It consisted of the County of York. It was abolished in 1914 when it was merged into York—Sunbury riding.

Members of Parliament

This riding elected the following Members of Parliament:

Election results

By-election: On Mr. Fisher's resignation, 3 October 1868 to become Judge of the Supreme Court of New Brunswick

By-election: On Mr. Pickard's death, 17 December 1883

By-election: On election being declared void by a Court decision, 11 June 1901

By-election: On Mr. Crocket being appointed judge, 11 December 1913

See also 

 List of Canadian federal electoral districts
 Past Canadian electoral districts

External links
Riding history from the Library of Parliament

Former federal electoral districts of New Brunswick